Gentlemen of the Night (also known as The Masked Avenger) is a 1964 Italian-French adventure film directed by Pino Mercanti and starring Guy Madison and Lisa Gastoni.

Plot 
Massimo returns to Venice after years of fighting against the Turks. He finds his beloved Elena, who in the meantime has married the doge who is tyrannizing the city. Despite the disappointment, he becomes interested in the beautiful Katarina. He decides to lead the group of rebels after a close friend of his is killed under torture for having hatched a plot to eliminate the doge.

Cast 
 Guy Madison as Massimo Tiepolo (based on Bajamonte Tiepolo)
 Lisa Gastoni as Elena
 Jean Claudio as Marco Donato
 Ingrid Schoeller as Catarina
 Gastone Moschin as Doge Pietro Gradenigo
  Vanni Materassi as Luca Badoer
 Dina De Santis as Parigina 
 Nino Persello as Badoer, the inquisitor

References

External links

  
1960s historical adventure films
Italian historical adventure films
Italian swashbuckler films
Films directed by Pino Mercanti 
Films set in Venice 
Films set in the 14th century
Lux Film films
1960s Italian films